HD 114837 is a suspected binary star system in the southern constellation of Centaurus. The brighter star is faintly visible to the naked eye with an apparent visual magnitude of 4.90. It is moving closer with a heliocentric radial velocity of −64 km/s, and will approach to within  in around 240,600 years.

It is about 3.4 billion years old with 1.14 times the mass of the Sun and about 1.3 times the Sun's radius. This star is radiating 3.12 times the Sun's luminosity from its photosphere at an effective temperature of 6,346 K.

References

F-type main-sequence stars
Centauri, 191
Centaurus (constellation)
Durchmusterung objects
0503
114837
064583
4989